This is a list of members of the European Parliament for the Slovenia in the 2014 to 2019 session.

See 2014 European Parliament election in Slovenia for further information on these elections in Slovenia.

List 
This table can be sorted by party or party group: click the symbol at the top of the appropriate column.

References

2014
List
Slovenia